Maybank Tower may refer to :

 Maybank Tower (Kuala Lumpur)
 Maybank Tower (Singapore)